Aleksandar Milivojša (born 13 March 1964) is a Serbian former professional basketball player.

Playing career 
A center, Milivojša played for Crvena zvezda, MZT Skopje, NAP Novi Sad, and Hungarian team Dombóvári VMSE.

National team career 
In August 1981, Milivojša was a member of the Yugoslavia Cadets team at the European Championship for Cadets in Greece. Over seven tournament games, he averaged 9.1 points per game.

In August 1982, Milivojša was a member of the Yugoslavia junior (under-18) team that won the silver medal at the European Championship for Juniors in Bulgaria. Over seven tournament games, he averaged 3.3 points per game. In August 1983, he was a member of the Junior (under-19) national team at the World Championship for Juniors in Palma de Mallorca, Spain. Over seven tournament games, he averaged 3.6 points per game.

See also 
 List of KK Crvena zvezda players with 100 games played

References

External links
 Profile at eurobasket.com

1964 births
Living people
Basketball players from Novi Sad
Centers (basketball)
KK Crvena zvezda players
KK MZT Skopje players
KK Novi Sad players
Serbian expatriate basketball people in Hungary
Serbian expatriate basketball people in North Macedonia
Serbian men's basketball players
Yugoslav men's basketball players